The Journal of the Korean Astronomical Society is a bimonthly open access peer-reviewed scientific journal of astronomy published by the Korean Astronomical Society. It covers original work and review articles from all branches of astronomy and astrophysics. The journal was established in 1968 and the editor-in-chief is Sascha Trippe.

Abstracting and indexing 
The journal is abstracted and indexed in:

Astrophysics Data System
Current Contents/Physical, Chemical & Earth Sciences
Inspec
Science Citation Index Expanded
Scopus
SIMBAD
According to the Journal Citation Reports, the journal has a 2017 impact factor of 1.545.

See also 
 List of astronomy journals
 List of physics journals
 Journal of the Korean Physical Society

References

External links 
 

Astronomy journals
Open access journals
Bimonthly journals
Publications established in 1968
English-language journals
Academic journals published by learned and professional societies
Astrophysics journals